A gin and tonic is a highball cocktail made with gin and tonic water poured over a large amount of ice. The ratio of gin to tonic varies according to taste, strength of the gin, other drink mixers being added, etc., with most recipes calling for a ratio between 1:1 and 1:3. It is usually garnished with a slice or wedge of lime. To preserve effervescence, the tonic can be poured down a bar spoon. The ice cools the gin, dulling the effect of the alcohol in the mouth and making the drink more pleasant and refreshing to taste.

In some countries (like the UK), gin and tonic is also marketed pre-mixed in single-serving cans. In the United States, most bars use "soda out of a gun that in no way, shape, or form resembles quinine water", according to bartender Dale DeGroff. To get a real gin and tonic, DeGroff recommends specifying bottled tonic. Alternatively, one can add tonic syrup to soda water.

It is commonly referred to as a G and T in the UK, US, Canada, Australia, New Zealand and Ireland. In some parts of the world, it is called a gin tonic (e.g. in Germany, Italy, France, Japan (phonetically "jin tonikku"), the Netherlands, Spain, Turkey). It is also referred to as "ginto" in Belgium and the Netherlands, and "GT" in Scandinavia.

Garnish and serving
Gin and tonic is traditionally garnished with a slice or wedge of lime, often slightly squeezed into the drink before being placed in the glass. In most parts of the world, lime remains the only usual garnish; however, lemon is often used as an alternative fruit. In the United Kingdom, the use of both lemon and lime together is known as an "Evans". Although the origins of the use of lemons are unknown, their use dates back at least as far as the late 1930s. The use of lemon or lime is a debated issue – some leading brands, such as Gordon's, Tanqueray, and Bombay Sapphire, recommend the use of lime in their gin.

The use of a balloon glass for serving gin has become popular, possibly through promotion by the Bombay Sapphire gin brand. The use of such a glass, with plenty of ice and a garnish tailored to the flavours of the gin, is sometimes said to allow the aromas of the drink to gather at its opening for the drinker to more easily appreciate.

The use of assorted fruits, herbs, and vegetables, as garnish (reflecting the botanicals of the individual gin), is increasingly popular. Besides the classic lime wheel or wedge, alternative garnishes can include orange peel, star anise, thyme-elderflower, a slice of ginger, pink grapefruit, rosemary, cucumber, mint, black peppercorns, strawberry and basil, strawberry syrup, or chillies. Fruits such as kumquats or other citrus or cucumber can be included.

History 
The cocktail was created by officers of the Presidency armies, the military force of the East India Company which operated on the Indian subcontinent. In the India subcontinent and other tropical regions, malaria was a persistent problem for Europeans, and in the 18th century, Scottish doctor George Cleghorn studied how quinine, a traditional cure for malaria, could be used to prevent the disease. The quinine was drunk in tonic water but the bitter taste was unpleasant. Presidency armies officers in India in the early 19th century took to adding a mixture of water, sugar, lime and gin to the quinine in order to make the drink more palatable, and thus the gin and tonic cocktail was born. The officers were already given a gin ration as part of their rations, and the sweet concoction made sense. Since it is no longer used as an antimalarial, tonic water today contains much less quinine, is usually sweetened, and is consequently much less bitter.

A 2004 study found that after 12 hours, "considerable quantities (500 to 1,000 ml) of tonic water may, for a short period of time, lead to quinine plasma levels at the lower limit of therapeutic efficacy and may, in fact, cause transitory suppression of parasites". This method of consumption of quinine was impractical for malaria prophylaxis, as the amount of drug needed "cannot be maintained with even large amounts of tonic". The authors concluded that it is not an effective form of treatment for malaria.

Variations

Mixers can include lime juice, lemon juice, orange juice and spiced simple syrup, grenadine, tea, etc.

A gin and tonic can also be mixed with a sorbet.

Some gin-and-tonic inspired drinks also have champagne (e.g. the Parisian), vermouth and Campari (e.g. the Negroni Sbagliato), vermouth and bitters (e.g. the Posh G&T), super smokey whiskey (e.g. the Ol' Smokey), peach liqueur and grapefruit bitters (e.g. the Tonic Delight), mint bitters, and chocolate liqueur (e.g. the Guilty Pleasure), etc.

In popular culture
The trans-galactic nature of the gin and tonic is imagined in Douglas Adams' novel The Restaurant at the End of the Universe, which describes how "85% of all known worlds in the Galaxy, be they primitive or highly advanced, have invented a drink called jynnan tonnyx, or gee-N'N-T'N-ix, or jinond-o-nicks, or any one of a thousand or more variations on the same phonetic theme. The drinks themselves are not the same, and vary between the Sivolvian 'chinanto/mnigs' which is ordinary water served at slightly above room temperature, and the Gagrakackan 'tzjin-anthony-ks' which kills cows at a hundred paces; and in fact the one common factor between all of them, beyond the fact that the names sound the same, is that they were all invented and named before the worlds concerned made contact with any other worlds."

James Bond specifies a recipe for a gin and tonic while in Kingston, Jamaica, in the book Dr. No. Unusually, it involves the juice of a whole lime.

In the BBC1 and Amazon Prime television series Fleabag, Fleabag and the Priest enjoy canned G&Ts from Marks and Spencer. The store reported a 24% increase in sales after the episodes aired. 

Founded in 2010, International Gin & Tonic Day is celebrated worldwide on 19 October.

Images

See also 

 Dubonnet, another drink invented to encourage European colonial soldiers in tropical climates to take quinine
 Lillet, an aperitif wine
 Pink Gin, Plymouth gin mixed with Angostura bitters
 Quinquina, a quinine-containing beverage sometimes used as a mixer with gin
 Beton, a cocktail made by mixing tonic water with Becherovka, a Czech bitters

References

External links

 Gin and tonic: An easy cocktail to make, but also easy to screw up.

Cocktails with gin
Quinine
Bubbly cocktails
Cocktails with tonic